Eatoniella glacialis is a species of minute sea snail, a marine gastropod mollusk in the family Eatoniellidae, the eatoniellids.

Distribution

Description 
The maximum recorded shell length is 3.77 mm.

Habitat 
Minimum recorded depth is 0 m. Maximum recorded depth is 393 m.

References

External links

Eatoniellidae
Gastropods described in 1907